Jamie Newman (born December 1, 1997) is an American professional Canadian football quarterback for the Hamilton Tiger-Cats of the Canadian Football League (CFL). He played college football at Wake Forest before transferring to Georgia in 2020, although he opted out of playing that season due to the COVID-19 pandemic. Newman signed with the Philadelphia Eagles as an undrafted free agent in 2021 but was released prior to the season.

Early years
Newman attended Graham High School in Graham, North Carolina. He was a four-year starter at quarterback in high school. He committed to Wake Forest University to play college football.

College career

Wake Forest

Newman redshirted his first year at Wake Forest in 2016. As a backup to John Wolford in 2017, he completed two of four passes for eight yards and an interception. Newman entered 2018 as backup to Sam Hartman, but started the final four games after Hartman was hurt. He was named the 2018 Birmingham Bowl MVP after throwing for 328 yards and a touchdown. For the season, he completed 84 of 141 passes for 1,083 yards, nine touchdowns and four interceptions. Newman beat out Hartman for the starting job entering 2019.

Georgia
In January 2020 Newman announced that he would transfer to Georgia for his final year of eligibility. That September, Newman announced that he would be opting out of the 2020 season due to concerns regarding the COVID-19 pandemic. As a result, Newman did not take a single snap with the Bulldogs.

Statistics

Professional career

Philadelphia Eagles 
Newman signed with the Philadelphia Eagles as an undrafted free agent on May 14, 2021, but was waived on June 9, 2021.

Hamilton Tiger-Cats 
Newman was signed by the Hamilton Tiger-Cats of the CFL on February 6, 2022. He scored his first touchdown on July 28, 2022, versus the Montréal Alouettes. Newman made his first CFL start on September 5, 2022 with starting quarterback Dane Evans nursing an injured shoulder. Newman proved ineffective in his debut, completing 14 of 25 pass attempts for 171 yards and an interception, and the Tiger-Cats were defeated 28-8 by their rivals the Toronto Argonauts, falling to last place in the East division.

References

External links
Hamilton Tiger-Cats bio
Wake Forest Demon Deacons bio

1997 births
Living people
African-American players of American football
People from Graham, North Carolina
Players of American football from North Carolina
American football quarterbacks
Wake Forest Demon Deacons football players
Georgia Bulldogs football players
Philadelphia Eagles players
21st-century African-American sportspeople
Canadian football quarterbacks
American players of Canadian football
Hamilton Tiger-Cats players